Yakov Fyodorovich Turgenev was a court jester to Peter I of Russia, and a Kiev colonel.

Early life 
Yakov Turgenev was born in the 17th century in the Russian Empire. His father was Fyodor Vasilievich Turgenev. He had seven grandfathers: 

 Peter Nikitich Turgenev

 Gregory Nikitich Turgenev
 Boris Nikitich Turgenev
 Vasily Nikitich Turgenev
 Osip Fedorovich Turgenev
 Vasily Fedorovich Turgenev
 Andrey F. Turgenev

Children 
 Logwin Turgenev - his only son

Career 
In 1671 he joined the service of the Reitarska system. In 1683, he was invited to the estate in Vorotynsky County. In 1694, he commanded a company in the Kozhuhovskaya campaign.

In 1700 Peter I ordered Turgenev to hold a wedding parody that was a parody of traditional customs. Ivan Fedorovich Romodanovsky portrayed the king and the queen was played by Ivan Buturlin. At the wedding Turgenev lampooned the boyars, following Peter's speech about cutting the boyars' beards..

Death 
Yakov Turgenev died at age 45 during a cruel joke of the The All-Joking, All-Drunken Synod of Fools and Jesters.

Sources 
 Transfiguration series. Portraits jesters. author unknown.

References

Jesters
Peter the Great